Mumbwa is a constituency of the National Assembly of Zambia. It covers Mumbwa and several other towns in Mumbwa District of Central Province.

List of MPs

References

Constituencies of the National Assembly of Zambia
Constituencies established in 1964
1964 establishments in Zambia